Chicago, (Chicago/Milwaukee in station announcements) is an 'L' station on the CTA's Blue Line.  The station is located at the intersection of Chicago Avenue and Milwaukee Avenue in the West Town neighborhood of Chicago, Illinois. From the Chicago Avenue station, trains run at intervals of 2–7 minutes during rush hour, and take 4 minutes to travel to the Loop.

Bus connections
CTA
  56 Milwaukee 
  66 Chicago (Owl Service)

See also
Chicago/State
Chicago/Franklin

Notes and references

Notes

References

External links

Chicago/Milwaukee Station Page
Chicago Avenue entrance from Google Maps Street View

CTA Blue Line stations
Railway stations in the United States opened in 1951
1951 establishments in Illinois